Guilherme Sucigan Mafra Cunha (born 20 April 2004), commonly known as Guilherme Biro or simply Biro is a Brazilian footballer who plays as a midfielder or defender for Corinthians.

Club career 
In December 2020 Guilherme Biro signed his first professional contract with Corinthians until the end of 2023. He made his first team debut on 2 July 2022 in 0–4 away defeat against Fluminense in Série A.

International career 
Guilherme Biro was called up to the under-15 team in 2019, and featured in the 2019 South American U-15 Championship.

Honours
Brazil U20
 South American U-20 Championship: 2023

References

External links 
 
 Guilherme Biro at playmakerstats.com (English version of ogol.com.br)
 Profile at meutimao.com.br (in Portuguese)

2004 births
Living people
Brazilian footballers
Association football midfielders
Campeonato Brasileiro Série A players
Sport Club Corinthians Paulista players